Nariyasu (written: 斉泰 or 成泰) is a masculine Japanese given name. Notable people with the name include:

, Japanese daimyō
, Japanese footballer and manager

Japanese masculine given names